Gelemo or Gelomo
(full name: Gelomoring)
is a border village in the Upper Subansiri district, Arunachal Pradesh, India. It is on the bank of the Tsari Chu river before its confluence with the Subansiri River, at a distance of "two days march" from the Indian claimed border at Longju. The present Line of Actual Control between China and India is at roughly half that distance.

Location 
Gelemo is in Limeking Circle of the Upper Subansiri district, one of the border areas adjoining the China–India border. The Tsari Chu river, called Gallen or Gelling by the Tagin people of the region, flows here from Migyitun in Tibet, traditionally considered a Tibetan border town. It joins the Subansiri River at Gelensiniak.

Upstream from Gelemo,  to the north, is the village of Bidak (also called  Redding Camp).

History 
An Indian expedition led by political officer S. M. Krishnatry in 1956 was told that Gelomo was the home of the Gibu-Gilo tribe of the Tagin people, but they were almost extinct with only one survivor left, who lived in Limeking. The location was controlled by the Mara tribe at that time, who used it as a hunting ground.

Tsari pilgrimage 
Gelemo lies on the route of the 12-yearly Tsari pilgrimage of the Tibetans around the Dakpa Sheri mountain. The pilgrimage went down the Tsari Chu valley up to Gelensiniak and returned via the Subansiri valley, back into the Tibetan territory.

The last Tsari pilgrimage was conducted in 1956, after which the Sino-Indian border conflict put a stop to the relations between the two regions.

Sino-Indian border conflict 
After the Longju incident in 1959, the Assam Rifles border troops stationed at Longju retreated to a place named "Gallen", which was most likely Gelemo.
Afterwards, a new border post was established at Maja,
3 miles south of Longju.
During the 1962 Sino-Indian War, the Maja post was withdrawn, along with all other posts, since the Chinese attacked with an overwhelming force. The withdrawing forces were said to have been attacked from the rear near Reding (Bidak). The Chinese forces were in occupation of the entire area up to Limeking for the duration of the war.

After the war, China proposed that both the sides should withdraw 20 km from the Line of Actual Control.
The local people call this location New Maza and distinguish it from the original Maja village.
The present Line of Actual Control is believed to run between the New Maja Post and the Chinese border post at Xingqiangpu Zhang.

In January 2021, news reports appeared stating that China had built a large 100-home civilian village near the original Maja village. The Chinese media have referred to it as "Lowa Xincun".

Demographics 
Gelemo has a population of 40 people living in 11 households, as per the 2011 census. Bidak (Redding Camp) has a population of 39 people in 7 households.

Facilities 
Gelemo is being developed as a "model village" by the Government of Arunachal Pradesh.
Solar street lights were installed in 2019. A potable water supply was installed in 2020. Irrigation canals, healthcare facilities, and a community hall are scheduled for construction.

In 2017, Indian Army set up Sawaiman Primary School in the Gelemo village.

Transportation 
There is a helipad at Gelemo, maintained by the Government of Arunachal Pradesh.

The Border Roads Organisation of India built a road link between Tame Chung Chung (near Gelensiniak) and Bidak in 2018. During its construction, Gelemo served as a construction base with all the construction equipment air lifted there in pieces and assembled locally.
The road connectivity is still seen as being poor.

Notes

References

Bibliography

External links 
 Fourteen families of Gelemo.. (bamboo products), pinterest.com, retrieved 14 November 2021.

Villages in Upper Subansiri district
Borders of Arunachal Pradesh